Alis Lesley (born Alice Lesley or Alice Leslie; April 20, 1938) is an American former rockabilly singer, once billed as "the female Elvis Presley."

Early life
Lesley was born in Chicago, Illinois, United States.  Her family later moved to Phoenix, Arizona, where she attended Phoenix Junior College.  She majored in television and radio, and began singing rockabilly while a student.  She was discovered by Kathryn Godfrey, a popular Phoenix television personality and the sister of Arthur Godfrey.  With Kathryn Godfrey's help, Lesley became a local favorite following her appearances on television station KTVK and in local night clubs.

Career
Lesley achieved brief national celebrity with the 1957 release of her Era single, "He Will Come Back to Me" backed with "Heartbreak Harry" (Era Records 45-1034). Lesley's stage persona as "The Female Elvis Presley" included a guitar slung around her neck, greased-back hair, and combed-down sideburns.

She toured Australia in October 1957 with Little Richard, Eddie Cochran, Gene Vincent, and local rocker Johnny O'Keefe. The tour was cut short when Richard underwent a "religious experience" and he retired from rock and roll for several years.

Legacy
A picture of Lesley between Little Richard and Eddie Cochran appears on the cover of The Philosophy of Modern Song written by Bob Dylan.

References

External links

1938 births
20th-century American women musicians
American rockabilly musicians
American women rock singers
Living people
Musicians from Phoenix, Arizona
Singers from Chicago